Crowfields Common is an 8.7 hectare Local Nature Reserve in Moulton in Northamptonshire. It is owned and managed by Moulton Parish Council.  

The site is grassland which has surviving medieval ridge and furrow. There are also mature trees and hedgerows, and a flower meadow.

There is access from Dove's Lane.

References

Local Nature Reserves in Northamptonshire